In enzymology, an anthranilate N-benzoyltransferase is an enzyme that catalyzes the chemical reaction

benzoyl-CoA + anthranilate  CoA + N-benzoylanthranilate

Thus, the two substrates of this enzyme are benzoyl-CoA and anthranilate, whereas its two products are CoA and N-benzoylanthranilate.

This enzyme belongs to the family of transferases, specifically those acyltransferases transferring groups other than aminoacyl groups.  The systematic name of this enzyme class is benzoyl-CoA:anthranilate N-benzoyltransferase.

References

 

EC 2.3.1
Enzymes of unknown structure
Anthranilates